Jayne Craike  (born 21 September 1961) is a New Zealand para-equestrian. At the 2000 Summer Paralympics, she won a gold medal in the Mixed Dressage – Championship Grade IV, and a silver medal in the Mixed Dressage – Freestyle Grade IV. She also competed at the 1996 and 2004 Summer Paralympics.

in the 2001 New Year Honours, Craike was appointed a Member of the New Zealand Order of Merit, for services to equestrian sport.

References

External links 
 
 

1961 births
Living people
New Zealand female equestrians
Paralympic equestrians of New Zealand
Paralympic gold medalists for New Zealand
Paralympic silver medalists for New Zealand
Paralympic medalists in equestrian
Equestrians at the 1996 Summer Paralympics
Equestrians at the 2000 Summer Paralympics
Equestrians at the 2004 Summer Paralympics
Medalists at the 2000 Summer Paralympics
Members of the New Zealand Order of Merit